is a Japanese voice actress who is affiliated with Arts Vision. She is known for her roles as Nagi Hisakawa in The Idolmaster Cinderella Girls, Maina Ichii in If My Favorite Pop Idol Made It to the Budokan, I Would Die, and Rie Maruyama in Cue!.

Career
Tachibana began her voice acting career after graduating from the Japan Narration Actor Institute. Her first role was as a background character in the anime series Zombie Land Saga in 2018. Her first named role was as the character Nagi Hisakawa in the mobile game The Idolmaster Cinderella Girls: Starlight Stage. Her first major anime followed in 2019 when she voiced Maina Ichii in If My Favorite Pop Idol Made It to the Budokan, I Would Die. Later that year she was cast as Rie Maruyama in the mobile game Cue!.

In 2021, Tachibana played Satono Diamond in the mobile game and anime series Uma Musume Pretty Derby. In 2022 she reprised the role of Rie Maruyama for the anime series adaptation of Cue!.

Filmography

Anime
2018
Zombie Land Saga, Girl

2019
The Idolmaster Cinderella Girls Theater Climax Season, Nagi Hisakawa

2020
If My Favorite Pop Idol Made It to the Budokan, I Would Die, Maina Ichii

2021
Uma Musume Pretty Derby, Satono Diamond

2022
Cue!, Rie Maruyama

2023
Uchi no Kaisha no Chiisai Senpai no Hanashi, Shiori Katase
Chained Soldier, Nei Ōkawamura

Games
2019
The Idolmaster Cinderella Girls: Starlight Stage, Nagi Hisakawa
Cue!, Rie Maruyama

2021
Uma Musume Pretty Derby, Satono Diamond
Lost Judgment, Minato Todo

2022
Arknights, Pudding

2023
Towa Tsugai, Enaga
Takt Op. Unmei wa Akaki Senritsu no Machi o, Pomp and Circumstance
Puella Magi Madoka Magica Side Story: Magia Record, Chizuru

References

External links
Agency profile 

Arts Vision voice actors
Japanese voice actresses
Living people
Voice actresses from Miyagi Prefecture
Year of birth missing (living people)